Energetik is a rural locality (a selo) in Neftekamsk, Bashkortostan, Russia. The population was 3,450 as of 2010. There are 8 streets.

References 

Rural localities in Neftekamsk urban okrug